The Lord Steward Act 1554 (1 Mary Sess 3 c 4) is an Act of the Parliament of England.

This Act was omitted from the third revised edition of the statute because of its local  nature.

This Act had not been wholly repealed in Great Britain at the end of 2010.

References
Halsbury's Statutes,

External links
The Lord Steward Act 1554, as amended, from the National Archives.

Acts of the Parliament of England (1485–1603)
1554 in England
1554 in law